Jeelugu Milli mandal is one of the 28 mandals in the Eluru district of the Indian state of Andhra Pradesh. It is administered under the Kovvur revenue division.

References 

Mandals in Eluru district